Luma or LUMA may refer to:

Arts
 La Trobe University Museum of Art, Melbourne, Australia
 LUMA Projection Arts Festival, an annual event featuring building-scale projection mapping and light installations in Binghamton, NY
 LUMA Foundation, promotes artistic projects
 LUMA Arles, art complex in Arles, France
 Loyola University Museum of Art, Chicago

Biology
 Luma (plant), a genus of plants in the myrtle family
 Amomyrtus luma, a species of tree in the myrtle family
 Luma (moth), a genus of moths of the family Crambidae

Companies
 LUMA Energy, a power utility company in Puerto Rico
 Luma Home, a wi-fi solutions company based in Atlanta, Georgia

Places
 Luma, Iran, a village in East Azerbaijan Province, Iran
 Lumë, a village in Kukës County, Albania
 Luma (region), a region in northeast Albania and southwest Kosovo and historic Albanian tribe

Other uses
 Luma, former name of Unified Theory (band)
 Luma, one hundredth of an Armenian dram
 Luma (Mario), a star species from the video game Super Mario Galaxy
 Luma (video), a signal used in video technology
 one of the channels of the YUV colorspace

Genus disambiguation pages